Ebenezer McBurney Byers (April 12, 1880 – March 31, 1932) was an American socialite, sportsman, and industrialist. He was able to do so due to his father being wealthy. He won the 1906 U.S. Amateur in golf. He earned notoriety in the early 1930s when he died from multiple radiation-induced cancers after consuming Radithor, a popular patent medicine made from radium dissolved in water.

Biography

The son of industrialist Alexander Byers, Eben Byers was educated at St. Paul's School and Yale College, where he earned a reputation as a sportsman. He was the U.S. Amateur golf champion of 1906, after finishing runner-up in 1902 and 1903. Byers eventually became the chairman of the Girard Iron Company, which had been created by his father.

In 1927, Byers injured his arm falling from a railway sleeping berth. For the persistent pain, a doctor suggested he take Radithor, a patent medicine manufactured by William J. A. Bailey. Bailey was a Harvard University dropout who falsely claimed to be a doctor of medicine and had become rich from the sale of Radithor, a solution of radium in water which he claimed stimulated the endocrine system. He offered physicians a 1/6 kickback on each dose prescribed.

Byers began taking several doses of Radithor per day, believing it gave him a "toned-up feeling", but stopped in October 1930 (after taking some 1400 doses) when that effect faded. He lost weight and had headaches, and his teeth began to fall out. In 1931, the Federal Trade Commission asked him to testify about his experience, but he was too sick to travel so the commission sent a lawyer to take his statement at his home; the lawyer reported that Byers's "whole upper jaw, excepting two front teeth and most of his lower jaw had been removed" and that "All the remaining bone tissue of his body was disintegrating, and holes were actually forming in his skull."

His death on March 31, 1932, was attributed to "radiation poisoning" using the terminology of the time, but it was due to cancers, not acute radiation syndrome. He is buried in Allegheny Cemetery in Pittsburgh, Pennsylvania, in a lead-lined coffin.

Legacy
Byers's trust in his physician's prescription led to his death, which received much publicity and heightened awareness of the dangers of radioactive "cures".

The Federal Trade Commission issued an order against Bailey's business to "cease and desist from various representations theretofore made by them as to the therapeutic value of Radithor and from representing that the product Radithor is harmless". He later founded the "Radium Institute" in New York and marketed a radioactive belt-clip, a radioactive paperweight, and a mechanism which purported to make water radioactive.

After exhuming Byers's body in 1965, MIT physicist Robley Evans estimated Byers' total radium intake as about 1000 μCi (37 MBq).

Major championships

Amateur wins

Results timeline

Note: Byers died before the founding of the Masters Tournament, and never played in The Open Championship. As an amateur, he could not play in the PGA Championship.

NT = No tournament
DNQ = Did not qualify for match play portion
R128, R64, R32, R16, QF, SF = Round in which player lost in match play

Source for U.S. Amateur: USGA Championship Database

Source for 1904 British Amateur: Golf, July 1904, pg. 6.

Source for 1907 British Amateur: The Glasgow Herald, May 29, 1907, pg. 12.

See also
Radioactive quackery

References

Further reading
 

American male golfers
Amateur golfers
Golfers from Pittsburgh
Yale College alumni
Victims of radiological poisoning
Deaths from cancer in New York (state)
Radioactive quackery
Burials at Allegheny Cemetery
1880 births
1932 deaths